Hearing Australia is a statutory authority constituted under the Australian Hearing Services Act 1991. Hearing Australia is the largest provider of government-funded hearing services in Australia. One of their areas of interest is hearing testing and rehabilitation of children under the age of 26.

Its research division, the National Acoustic Laboratories, broadly focuses its research into the areas of hearing assessment, hearing loss prevention, hearing rehabilitation devices, and hearing rehabilitation procedures.

History
Hearing Australia is the current incarnation of the Acoustic Research Laboratory that was set up in 1942. Its initial purpose was the investigation of noise on behalf of the Australian Military during World War II. After the war it helped those children whose hearing was affected by earlier rubella outbreaks.

The Commonwealth Department of Health (now the Department of Health and Ageing) took over the Laboratory and was renamed the Commonwealth Acoustic Laboratories, with the aim of providing hearing services for children and veterans. It was in 1973 renamed the National Acoustic Laboratories.

The Australian Hearing Services Act 1991 established it as Australian Hearing Services, a Commonwealth Government statutory authority. The name National Acoustic Laboratories was retained for its research division. When the Department of Human Services was formed in 2004, the agency now known as Australian Hearing was moved into its portfolio.

Eligibility criteria
To be eligible for subsidised hearing services from Hearing Australia, one must be an Australian resident or permanent resident, and meet one of the following categories:
 Anyone under the age of 26 (before 1 January 2012 eligibility was lost at 21)
 Holders of Pensioner concession cards, or their dependants
 Recipients of a sickness allowance from Centrelink, or their dependants
 Department of Veterans' Affairs Gold Repatriation Health Card holders, or their dependants
 Department of Veterans' Affairs White Repatriation Health Card holders where hearing loss is specified, or their dependants
 Australian Defence Force personnel
 Aboriginal and Torres Strait Islander peoples aged 50 and over
 Aboriginal and Torres Strait Islander peoples participating in a Community Development Employment Project (CDEP).
 Those requiring specialist hearing services through the Community Service Obligations (CSO) component of the Hearing Services Program.

Hearing Australia also provides private hearing services to anyone who does not fall into the above categories.

References

External links
 Hearing Australia
 National Acoustic Laboratories

Commonwealth Government agencies of Australia
Medical and health organisations based in Australia
Audiology organizations